Huntress Glacier is a glacier  long and  wide flowing into the head of False Bay, Livingston Island in the South Shetland Islands, Antarctica. It is situated east of Johnsons Glacier, southeast of Contell Glacier and Balkan Snowfield, south of upper Perunika Glacier, southwest of Huron Glacier and northwest of Macy Glacier, and is bounded by Friesland Ridge and the Tangra Mountains to the southeast, Nesebar Gap, Pliska Ridge, Burdick Ridge and Willan Nunatak to the north, and Charrúa Gap and Napier Peak to the northwest.

The glacier was named by the UK Antarctic Place-Names Committee in 1958 after the American schooner Huntress (Captain Christopher Burdick) from Nantucket, which visited the South Shetland Islands in 1820–21 in company with the Huron of New Haven, Connecticut.

Location

See also
 List of glaciers in the Antarctic
 Glaciology

Maps
 L.L. Ivanov et al. Antarctica: Livingston Island and Greenwich Island, South Shetland Islands. Scale 1:100000 topographic map. Sofia: Antarctic Place-names Commission of Bulgaria, 2005.
 L.L. Ivanov. Antarctica: Livingston Island and Greenwich, Robert, Snow and Smith Islands. Scale 1:120000 topographic map.  Troyan: Manfred Wörner Foundation, 2009.  
 L.L. Ivanov. Antarctica: Livingston Island and Smith Island. Scale 1:100000 topographic map. Manfred Wörner Foundation, 2017.

References

External links
 SCAR Composite Antarctic Gazetteer

Glaciers of Livingston Island